The Eurovision Song Contest 1985 was the 30th edition of the annual Eurovision Song Contest. Organised by the European Broadcasting Union (EBU) and host broadcaster Sveriges Television (SVT), the contest was held at the Scandinavium on the 4th of May 1985 and was hosted by previous Swedish contestant Lill Lindfors.

This was Norway's first victory in the contest, after a long period of low scores, including 3 "nul points".

Location

Gothenburg is the second-largest city in Sweden and the fifth-largest in the Nordic countries. Construction of the arena began in 1969 after decades of setbacks. The arena was inaugurated on 18 May 1971 and was the biggest feature for the city's failed bid for the 1984 Winter Olympics. At the time, Scandinavium was the largest indoor venue in the world and until the 2000 contest in Stockholm was the largest arena to host the event.After the inauguration,this is the home arena for Frölunda HC of Swedish Hockey League, and venue for the annual Gothenburg Horse Show.

Format
In 1985, thirteen previous Eurovision artists made a comeback. This applied to the winners, Bobbysocks! who had attended once before as soloists: Hanne Krogh performed for Norway in 1971, while Elisabeth Andreasson for Sweden (where she is originally from) in 1982 in a duet, Chips, with Kikki Danielsson. Kikki returned this year for host country Sweden, and was thus competing against Elisabeth Andreasson and Bobbysocks!.

The presenter was entertainer Lill Lindfors (herself a former participant in 1966), who had a wardrobe malfunction (though technically this is a misnomer, as the stunt was deliberate) as she proceeded to the stage for the voting procedure. As she walked on stage, the skirt of her dress came away, leaving her in just her underwear and the top half of her dress. After a few seconds of pretending to be shocked, Lindfors unfastened the flaps of her dress across her shoulders, to reveal a full-length white gown, to much raucous audience applause. Lill then took her seat to start calling in the votes, and nonchalantly said, "I just wanted to wake you up a little."

Lys Assia, the winner of the first ever Eurovision Song Contest in 1956, was the guest of honour in 1985. She was introduced by Lill Lindfors. The camera zoomed close to Lys, who rose to greet the audience, while the orchestra played the song "Refrain", her winning song.

The video postcards, broadcast in between each song to introduce the competing nation, were the first in the contest history to feature only the song writers and composers, and not the performing artist (unless they had composed their own song). All the song writers were filmed in various locations in and around Gothenburg during the week of rehearsals. Once the video concluded, hostess Lill Lindfors introduced the song, the artist and the conductor from a seat on the stage, reading from cards represented by the flag of each nation.

Host Lill Lindfors congratulated the duo, Hanne Krogh and Elisabeth Andreasson, following their victory by saying, "I must say I am honestly very happy that this happened because Norway has been last so many times that you really deserve it!" Krogh replied, "You're happy? What do you think we are?!" After an energetic reprise, the two women embraced to a standing ovation from the audience. During the reprise the last verse of the winning entry was sung in English.

Participating countries 
19 countries participated in the contest. Greece and Israel returned to the contest after not participating the previous year. Meanwhile, the Netherlands did not participate in this contest, due to the national Remembrance of the Dead, while Yugoslavia did not participate due to the anniversary of the death of Josip Broz Tito. Despite this, Yugoslavia still held their annual preselection contest, which was won by "Pokora" ("Penance") (music by Ivo Pupačić and lyrics by Zvonimir Pupačić), a duet sung by Zorica Kondža and Josip Genda. However, as Yugoslavia had already withdrawn before the song won, this song was never set to compete in Eurovision. Yugoslavia did, however, take part in the 1991 contest which was also held on the anniversary of Tito's death.1985 was also the last year to have less than 20 participants competing in the final.

Conductors 
Each performance had a conductor who directed the orchestra. 1985 was the only year to feature a conductor for multiple entries that wasn't the host conductor: Greek conductor Haris Andreadis led the orchestra for both the Cypriot and Greek entries.

 Noel Kelehan
 Ossi Runne
 Haris Andreadis
 Wolfgang Käfer
 Juan Carlos Calderón
 Michel Bernholc
 Garo Mafyan
 Curt-Eric Holmquist
 José Calvário
 
 Kobi Oshrat
 Fiorenzo Zanotti
 Terje Fjærn
 John Coleman
 Anita Kerr
 Curt-Eric Holmquist
 Richard Oesterreicher
 Norbert Daum
 Haris Andreadis

Returning artists 
Bold indicates a previous winner.

Participants and results

Detailed voting results 

Each country had a jury who awarded 12, 10, 8, 7, 6, 5, 4, 3, 2, 1 point(s) for their top ten songs.

During the voting, Germany took a commanding lead in the first half, with Norway fifth place behind Germany, Sweden, Italy and the United Kingdom around the end of the first half of voting. Finally, with five juries left, Germany, Sweden and Norway were tightly wrapped around the pole positions with 87, 86, and 85 points respectively. At that point, Sweden briefly took the lead away from Germany (who received no points from Switzerland). Sweden was the fourth-to-last jury, conceding their brief lead by awarding Germany eight points and Norway the maximum twelve. With only three countries left to vote, Norway kept the lead, in one of the shortest winning stretches during voting in the contest's history.

12 points
Below is a summary of all 12 (douze) points in the final:

Spokespersons 

Each country announced their votes in the order of performance. The following is a list of spokespersons who announced the votes for their respective country.

 John Skehan
 Annemi Genetz
 Anna Partelidou
 
 Matilde Jarrín
 Clémentine Célarié
 Fatih Orbay
 An Ploegaerts
 Maria Margarida Gaspar
 
 Yitzhak Shim'oni
 Beatrice Cori
 Erik Diesen
 Colin Berry
 Michel Stocker
 Agneta Bolme Börjefors
 
 Frédérique Ries
 Irini Gavala

Broadcasts 

Each participating broadcaster was required to relay the contest via its networks. Non-participating EBU member broadcasters were also able to relay the contest as "passive participants". Broadcasters were able to send commentators to provide coverage of the contest in their own native language and to relay information about the artists and songs to their television viewers. Known details on the broadcasts in each country, including the specific broadcasting stations and commentators are shown in the tables below.

Notes

References

External links

 

 
1985
Music festivals in Sweden
1985 in Sweden
1985 in music
1980s in Gothenburg
May 1985 events in Europe
Events in Gothenburg